A ridge turret is  a turret or small tower constructed over the ridge or apex between two or more sloping roofs of a building. It is usually built either as an architectural ornament for purely decorative purposes or else for the practical housing of a clock, a bell or an observation platform. Its function is thus different from that of a roof lantern, despite a frequent similarity of external appearance. It can have a flat roof but usually has a pointed roof or other kind of apex over.

When the height of a roof turret exceeds its width it is usually called a tower or steeple in English architecture, and when the height of a ridge turret's roof exceeds its width, it is called a spire in English architecture or a flèche in French architecture.

Images

Architectural elements
Roofs
Turrets